The Bab al-Tabbaneh–Jabal Mohsen conflict was a recurring conflict between the Sunni Muslim residents of the Bab-al-Tabbaneh neighbourhood and the Alawite residents of the Jabal Mohsen neighbourhood of Tripoli, Lebanon from 1976 through 2015. Residents of the two neighbourhoods became rivals during the Lebanese Civil War and frequently engaged in violence. Residents were divided along sectarian lines and by their opposition to or support of the Alawite-led Syrian government. Violence flared up during the Syrian Civil War spillover in Lebanon.

Background
For centuries, Sunni Muslims and Alawites have fought each other. The Sunni Ottoman Empire oppressed Alawites, but Alawites gained power and influence when the French recruited them as soldiers during the French Mandate of Syria. 

After independence from France, Alawites' co-religionists came to power in Syria in 1966 and have been represented by the al-Assad family since 1970. This event angered some of the Sunni majority of Syria. They reacted with an Islamist uprising in Syria, which was crushed by the 1982 Hama massacre.

With 500,000 inhabitants, Tripoli is the second-largest city in Lebanon. Because a large part of its population is Sunni Muslims, the city is the traditional bastion of conservative Sunnis in Lebanon. Sunnis represent 27% of Lebanon's entire population. 

Because it is a Sunni stronghold, all major currents of Lebanese Sunni Islamism have been centered in Tripoli. Black banners decorated with extracts from the Quran are prevalent and larger numbers of women are taking up the niqab. In addition, many free religious schools preach rigid Sunni doctrines.  Tripoli is also the birthplace of Lebanon's Salafi movement, a puritanical Sunni movement. The Sunnis of Bab al-Tabbaneh have close ties with Saudi Arabia, which supports them financially.

Nearly half of the Alawites of Lebanon live in the Jabal Mohsen neighbourhood of Tripoli and nearby villages in Akkar, north Lebanon. Of the 120,000 Alawites in Lebanon, 40,000 to 60,000 live in Tripoli. They have close ties with the Alawites in Syria.

The two neighbourhoods are divided by Syria Street, with Jabal Mohsen on a hilltop and Bab al-Tabbaneh below. While the neighbourhoods were once prosperous, many buildings were destroyed by the flood of Nahr Abu Ali (River of Abou-Ali) in 1956 and the Lebanese Civil War. Many residents of the two neighbourhoods are unemployed. North Lebanon is one of the most impoverished parts of Lebanon and is neglected by the government, promoting extremism. Despite its tumultuous history, there are still many architectural treasures in the area.

The Lebanese Civil War

During the Lebanese Civil War (1975-1990), Lebanese Alawites in the Jabal-Mohsen-based Arab Democratic Party (ADP) aligned with Syria. They fought alongside the Syrian Army against the Sunni Islamist Tawhid Movement in Tripoli, which was based mainly in Bab-Tabbaneh. Before the war, the populations of the two neighbourhoods lived side by side.

In August 1984, violent clashes erupted between the ADP and the Tawheed, supported by the Mosques and Islamic Committees. The Tawheed's position was strengthened when they gained control of the port on 22 August, after street battles left more than 400 dead. The fighting lasted until a Syrian-mediated peace agreement between the IUM and the ADP came into force on 18 September. By 1985, Tawhid had control over Tripoli, and the ADP was entrenched in Jabal Mohsen.

On 18 December 1986, the Syrians arrested Tawheed commander Samir al-Hassan in Tripoli. His men responded by killing 15 Syrian soldiers at a checkpoint, leading to Syrian retaliation against the Tawheed. Aided by ADP, LCP, SSNP, and Baath Party militias, the Syrians defeated the Tawheed, killing many of its fighters, arresting others, and scattering the remainder.

2008 conflict

During the 2008 conflict in Lebanon, Sunnis fought against Alawites. The ADP rearmed during the 2007 Lebanon conflict, after it was revealed that the Islamist group Fatah al-Islam had planned to attack the Alawites of Tripoli.

On the night of 10 May into the morning of 11 May, fighting broke out between Alawite Hezbollah sympathizers and Sunni supporters of Islamist groups in Tripoli. One woman was killed. On 11 May, Sunni supporters of the Islamic groups had reportedly been fighting opposition followers in the Alawite-dominated Jabal Mohsen area with machine guns and rocket-propelled grenades. On 12 May, clashes in Tripoli left one person dead and at least six others wounded. The Army stated that if clashes did not end by the next morning, they would use force.

Clashes between pro-government Sunnis based in the Bab el-Tabaneh district and pro-Syrian Alawites from Jabal Mohsen led to the deaths of at least nine people, eight civilians and a policeman; 55 others were wounded. Machine guns and rocket-propelled grenades were used in the clashes, which started around four in the morning.

Between 25 July and 29 July, 23 people were killed in clashes between Sunni and Alawite militants. On 8 September, Alawite and Sunni leaders signed a reconciliation agreement that ended the fighting. Sunni Future Movement leader Saad Hariri subsequently visited Tripoli stating, "We are both Lebanese and we will not allow anyone to tamper with us. I will do everything I can in order not to let anyone damage the Alawites' security in Tripoli and to foil any external plot to tamper with the security of the Alawites or the security of Tripoli". 

Rifa'at Eid, the leader of the armed wing of the ADP, said in an interview, "We're the most convenient targets, the stand-in for Hezbollah; our problem can only be solved when the Shiites and Sunnis solve theirs."
As many as 9,000 Alawis fled their homes during the conflict.

From 9-11 July armed rival political factions engaged in armed clashes and rocket attacks, killing five civilians and political affiliates and wounding over 85 civilians and political affiliates.

2009–2009
In October 2009, Jabal Mohsen was attacked with grenades by unknown assailants.

Despite missiles having been launched into Jabal Mohsen a few months before, children from both neighbourhoods played peaceful football matches in mixed teams during the Open Fun Football Festival on 2 November 2010. Weeks later, rockets were fired into Jabal Mohsen, and a bomb was found near the house of ADP leader Ali Eid.

Clashes during the Syrian Civil War

June 2011

On 17 June 2011, clashes between gunmen in Jabal Mohsen and Bab al-Tabbaneh erupted after a rally in support of Syrian protesters in Bab-al-Tabbaneh. Seven people were killed, and 59 were wounded. Among the dead were a Lebanese army soldier and an official from the Alawite ADP.

February 2012 
Between 10 and 11 February 2012, two to three people died because of fighting in Jabal Mohsen and Bab al-Tebbaneh. Six Lebanese Army soldiers were injured while attempting to intervene. The skirmishes lead to fears that the Syrian Civil War would spill into Lebanon.

May 2012
Between 12 and 13 May, witnesses and security officials said two to four people had been killed when the fighting started between members of the Alawite minority and members of the Sunni majority. The combatants used rocket-propelled grenades and automatic rifles. Hours before the clashes, Lebanese troops had exchanged fire with a group of young Islamists protesting for the release of a suspected terrorist. The exchange of gunfire between the Islamists and the army occurred as the protestors, who were sympathetic to the ongoing revolt in Syria, tried to approach the offices of the pro-Assad Syrian Social Nationalist Party in Lebanon. Three of the dead were reportedly Sunni civilians, while one was an army officer. 

Fighting continued on 14 May, with six more people being killed, five Alawites and one Sunni. The army was deployed to the area on 15 May and exchanged gunfire with residents. Eight were wounded, including a soldier. By 16 May, the clashes left eleven dead.

Western diplomatic sources stated that these incidents were the beginning of a Salafist revolution, aimed at arming the uprising in Syria. The Saudi-backed March 14 coalition accused Syria of trying to bring Lebanon into its crisis. On 14 March, Mustafa Alloush stated after the coalition's regular weekly meeting, "It is actually an attempt to make Tripoli a zone of terrorism. It also aims at striking Lebanon's northern area which has welcomed and helped out the Syrian displaced." Since the unrest in Syria started in May 2011, Tripoli and North Lebanon had an increase in Syrian refugees.

By 18 May, a total of twelve people were dead and over 100 wounded from the May clashes. On 21 May, several rocket-propelled grenades were fired between Jabal Mohsen and Bab al-Tebbaneh, with no reports of any wounded. On 30 May, two were wounded in clashes between Jabal Mohsen and Bab al-Tebbaneh.

One Sunni Muslim fought alongside the ADP and was killed in the May clashes. He was condemned as a traitor by his fellow Sunnis.

June 2012
Between 2 June and 3 June, fifteen people were killed and over sixty wounded in clashes between Jabal Mohsen and Bab al-Tebbaneh. As a result of the fighting, the Army re-entered Syria Street to set up a buffer zone between the two sides. Following a cease-fire, there were several violations of the truce during the night of 3 June; one policeman and one soldier were wounded. On 8 June, a man in Jabal Mohsen was killed by sniper fire. During the fighting, Jabal Mohsen was attacked on several fronts, including the Bab al-Tabbaneh, Shaarani, Baqqar, Riva, Mankoubin, and Malouleh districts. In the aftermath, several Alawite businesses in Tripoli were burnt down.

July 2012
On 18 July, stray bullets killed one person and wounded several during anti-Assad celebrations in Bab Tabbaneh, following a suicide-bombing that targeted several Syrian ministers. On 21 July, Tabbaneh residents clashed over non-political matters between two Sunni families, killing two and wounding several. Two more were killed in the dispute on 29 July. On 27 July, two men on their way home to Jabal Mohsen were stabbed by unidentified assailants, leading to clashes between gunmen. Clashes continued the following day, wounding twelve civilians and three soldiers.

August 2012
On 9 August, Sunni supporters of Hezbollah clashed with Salafists in Tripoli. On 20 and 21 August, seven people were killed and more than 100 wounded in clashes between Sunni Muslims and Alawites. According to security and medical sources, this class was a spillover from the war in Syria. Two of the dead were from Jabal Mohsen, while the rest were from Bab al-Tabbaneh. Five Lebanese soldiers were injured by gunfire, and another five the next day after a grenade was thrown at an army checkpoint. Fighting continued throughout 23 August, with at least two additional deaths reported.

On 24 August, more fighting occurred after a dawn exchange of small arms fire and rocket-propelled grenades between Sunni and Alawite fighters in the Qobbah and Jabal Muhsin neighbourhoods. The skirmish provoked unrest throughout both districts, and at least seven Alawite-owned shops in Sunni neighbourhoods were burned by unknown assailants. The fighting escalated after the death of Sunni cleric Sheikh Khaled al Baradei, who was shot by a sniper during the morning skirmishes. Baradei was reportedly a commander of the Sunni Islamist fighters, and his death led to further sectarian unrest within the city. At least three people were killed and 21 wounded, including two journalists. Fighting continued until 24 August.

October 2012
Clashes broke out on 19 October following the assassination of Wissam al-Hassan, leaving one dead. On 21 October, clashes occurred throughout the country which were triggered by the assassination. Two young girls and a man were killed during clashes between Bab Tabbaneh and Jabal Mohsen. The parents of one of the girls, a nine-year-old called Jana, crossed sectarian lines, as her father is Sunni and her mother is Alawite. Two Sunnis and one Alawi were killed on 22 October. By 24 October, eleven people had been killed in the fighting.

December 2012
At least twelve people were killed and 73 injured in Tripoli between 4 and 6 December, as Alawites and Sunnis were involved in heavy clashes. These clashes were sparked by the Tall Kalakh incident, where twenty Lebanese Salafists on their way to join the insurgency in Syria were ambushed.

2013
On 28 February, five men were arrested for throwing grenades into both neighbourhoods. They claimed they had been tasked by "Z.S." to create strife. During March 2013, sporadic incidents happened between the neighbourhoods. Two people were injured by sniper fire in Jabal Mohsen. Three days later, a man from Jabal Mohsen was shot and killed. By 22 March, six people, including an army soldier, had been killed. On 23 March, three more people were killed.

On 19 and 20 May, two civilians and two soldiers were killed during renewed fighting between the neighbourhoods. By 22 May, twelve people had been killed since the fighting resumed. After being targeted, he Lebanese army pulled out of the city on 23 May. Six more were killed the following night after mortars were used for the first time. By 26 May, 31 people were killed. After two days of calm, six more people were killed within 24 hours. Later, the army raided Jabal Mohsen. ADP leader Rifa'at Eid questioned why Jabal Mohsenhad was targeted by the army since similar raids were not done in Bab al-Tabbaneh.

On 29 and 30 November, thirteen people were killed in clashes.

August 2013 Tripoli bombing 

On 23 August 2013, twin bombings in Tripoli caused extensive damage, killing 47 people and wounding more than 500, according to Lebanon's state-run National News Agency.

2014
On 20 January 2014, Abdul Rahman Diab, an ADP official, was gunned down in his car in Tripoli.  Over nine days in March 2014, 25 people were killed and 175 were wounded.

January 2015

On 10 January 2015, two suicide bombers killed nine people and wounded thirty more in a Jabal Mohsen café. It was the first suicide attack on a civilian neighbourhood in nearly a year, following a security sweep.

See also
 Lebanese Civil War
 Weapons of the Lebanese Civil War
 2nd Infantry Brigade (Lebanon)

References

External links

 BBC Arabic documentary about the conflict
 Vice News documentary about the conflict
 Press TV documentary about the conflict

Lebanese Civil War
Syrian civil war spillover in Lebanon
2008 in Lebanon
2010s in Lebanon
Articles containing video clips
Religion-based wars
21st century in Tripoli, Lebanon